Chen Shu-chin (born 19 September 1974) is a Taiwanese international footballer who played as a midfielder for the Chinese Taipei women's national football team. She was part of the team at the 1991 FIFA Women's World Cup. On club level she played for Jinwen College in Taiwan.

References

External links
 

1974 births
Living people
Taiwanese women's footballers
Chinese Taipei women's international footballers
Place of birth missing (living people)
1991 FIFA Women's World Cup players
Women's association football midfielders
Asian Games medalists in football
Asian Games bronze medalists for Chinese Taipei
Footballers at the 1994 Asian Games
Medalists at the 1994 Asian Games